Akmezar is a village in the Gülağaç District, Aksaray Province, Turkey. Its population is 888 (2021).

References

Villages in Gülağaç District